Tom Hardy Alandh, (born 13 June 1944) is a Swedish journalist and documentary director. Alandh studied journalism between 1969 and 1970. In 1972 he began working for SVT as a reporter and producer. Since 1981 he has produced close to one hundred documentary films for Swedish public service television. He rose to prominence with his 1987 breakthrough TV documentary about the rise and fall of soccer star Nacka Skoglund. In 1987 Alandh was awarded the Stora journalistpriset. In 2011 he received an honourable award at the television gala Kristallen.

References

External links 

Living people
1944 births
Artists from Stockholm
20th-century Swedish journalists
Swedish documentary filmmakers
21st-century Swedish journalists